Delias sinak is a butterfly in the family Pieridae. It was described by Henricus Jacobus Gerardus van Mastrigt in 1990. It is found in Sinak-Mulia in Irian Jaya.

The wingspan is about 50 mm. Adults are similar to Delias sagessa.

References

External links
Delias at Markku Savela's Lepidoptera and Some Other Life Forms

sinak
Butterflies described in 1990